The 2017 U Sports football season began on August 25 with the St. Francis Xavier X-Men visiting the Saint Mary's Huskies in Halifax, Nova Scotia and the Montreal Carabins visiting the Concordia Stingers in Montreal, Quebec. The season concluded on November 25 with the 53rd Vanier Cup championship at Tim Hortons Field in Hamilton, Ontario. This season saw the first conference shift since 2001 with the Bishop's Gaiters moving from the Quebec Student Sport Federation to the Atlantic University Sport conference. 27 university teams in Canada participated in the newly re-branded U Sports football, the highest level of amateur Canadian football. The Western Mustangs defeated the Laval Rouge et Or, 39-17, to win their first Vanier Cup since 1994.

Regular season

Conference changes 
On December 15, 2016, Bishop's University Athletics and Atlantic University Sport (AUS) announced that the Bishop's Gaiters would be joining the AUS conference beginning in 2017. The move increases the number of teams competing in the AUS from four to five, while reducing the teams in the Quebec Student Sport Federation (RSEQ) from six to five. It also marked the first time since 1990 that the AUS had more than four teams, when the University College of Cape Breton played for one season before disbanding. This change also brought an end to the scheduled interlocking play with the RSEQ that had been in place since 2002.

Schedules 
The schedule for the Ontario University Athletics conference was released on January 18, 2017 with 11 teams playing over the course of nine weeks with each team receiving one bye week. Compared to the previous season, there were no major format changes. The OUA will begin play on August 26, 2017 with the Carleton Ravens visiting the Queen's Gaels at Richardson Memorial Stadium. Eight other OUA teams will play the following day. The regular season will conclude on October 21, 2017 with the Yates Cup championship game taking place three weeks later on November 11, 2017.

On January 23, 2017, the schedule changes for the AUS were revealed, with the conference opening the season two weeks earlier than usual on Friday August 25 with the St. Francis Xavier X-Men visiting the Saint Mary's Huskies. Each team will play the other four teams twice with each team also having two bye weeks over the ten-week schedule. With these changes, the AUS will also now permit teams to play one out-of-conference exhibition game, in lieu of interlock play with the RSEQ being eliminated. There are three Friday night regular season games in the AUS with the remaining 17 games being played on Saturday afternoons. The regular season will conclude on October 28, 2017 and playoff format will remain the same despite an additional team; the second place team will host the third place team in the semi-final and the first place team will host the Loney Bowl championship game on November 11, 2017.

The Quebec Student Sport Federation released their schedule on February 21, 2017. Following the aforementioned departure of Bishop's, the conference's schedule featured five teams for the first time since 2002. Similar to the AUS schedule, the five teams will play eight regular season games over ten weeks with each team receiving two bye weeks. In contrast to the AUS, the RSEQ will have its top four teams qualify for the playoffs with two semi-final games and the winners of those games playing for the Dunsmore Cup on November 11, 2017. This was the same format used when the conference had five teams in 2002. Of the 20 games scheduled, two are on Thursdays, five are on Fridays, 11 are on Saturdays, and two are on Sundays.

With the changes to the other conferences, the Canada West Universities Athletic Association was left as the only conference with an even number of teams and there were no major format changes when the schedule was unveiled on April 18, 2017. All six teams will play on September 1, 2017 and conclude their seasons on October 28, 2017. As usual, all teams will have a bye week on Thanksgiving Day weekend. In total, eight regular season games will be played on Fridays and 16 will be played on Saturdays. Similar to the other conferences, the conference championship game, the Hardy Cup, will be played on November 11, 2017.

Cancelled game 
On October 4, 2017, it was announced that the October 5 game between the Montreal Carabins and Concordia Stingers was cancelled due to Montreal players and coaching staff members exhibiting flu symptoms. Due to scheduling constraints, the game was outright cancelled and would not be rescheduled. Montreal and Concordia would only play sevens games as a result and winning percentage would be counted in the standings as opposed to point totals. If teams are tied in the standings based on win percentage, head-to-head results would be used as a second tie-breaker. The decision was met with controversy as a similar situation in 2006 had the St. Francis Xavier X-Men forfeit a game to the McGill Redmen due to illnesses on their team rather than the game count as a no-decision.

Standings

Post-season awards

A. Nick Cross had originally won the Peter Gorman Trophy, but was stripped of the award following a cannabis violation and it was instead awarded to Tre Ford.

All-Canadian team 

 First team 
Offence
 QB - Noah Picton - Regina
 RB - Alex Taylor - Western
 RB - Ed Ilnicki - Alberta
 IR - Trivell Pinto - British Columbia
 IR - Mitch Hillis - Saskatchewan
 WR - Kurleigh Gittens Jr. - Laurier
 WR - Kaion Julien-Grant - St. Francis Xavier
 C - Zach Annen - Carleton
 G - Justin Lawrence - Alberta
 G - Andrew Pickett - Guelph
 T - Mark Korte - Alberta
 T - David Brown - Western
Defence
 DT - Vincent Desjardins - Laval
 DT - Connor Griffiths	- British Columbia
 DE - Mathieu Betts - Laval
 DE - Jadarius Ceasar - Saint Mary's
 LB - Adam Auclair - Laval
 LB - Nelkas Kwemo - Queen's
 LB - Jean-Gabriel Poulin - Western
 FS - Stavros Katsantonis - British Columbia
 HB - Gabriel Ouellet - Laval
 HB - Malcom Lee - British Columbia
 CB - Jamie Harry - Ottawa	
 CB - Godfrey Onyeka - Laurier
Special teams
 P - TJ Morton - Toronto
 K - Gabriel Ferraro - Guelph
 RET - Johnny King - Saint Mary's
 Second team 
Offence
 QB - Hugo Richard - Laval
 RB - Nathan Carter - Carleton
 RB - Jean-Guy Rimpel - Concordia
 IR - Nathan Rowe - Alberta
 IR - Guillaume Paquet	- Montreal
 WR - Jacob Scarfone - Guelph
 WR - Jeremy Sauvageau	- McGill
 C - Francis Lapointe - Sherbrooke
 G - Samuel Thomassin - Laval
 G - Ryan Sceviour - Calgary
 T - Gustave Sylvestre	- Montreal
 T - Maurice Simba - Concordia
Defence
 DT - Brett Wade - Calgary
 DT - Adam Melanson - Acadia
 DE - Kene Onyeka - Carleton
 DE - Cory Robinson - Calgary
 LB - Nick Cross - Regina
 LB - Boston Rowe - Calgary
 LB - Mickael Côté - Concordia
 FS - François Hamel - Montreal
 HB - Jackson Bennett - Ottawa
 HB - Marc-Antoine Dequoy - Montreal
 CB - Will Maxwell - British Columbia
 CB - Khadeem Pierre - Concordia
Special teams
 P - Félix Ménard-Brière - Montreal  
 K - Marc Liegghio - Western
 RET - Kurleigh Gittens Jr. - Laurier

Post-season 
The Vanier Cup is played between the champions of the Mitchell Bowl and the Uteck Bowl, the national semi-final games. In 2017, according to the rotating schedule, the Canada West Hardy Trophy championship team will host the Québec conference Dunsmore Cup championship team for the Mitchell Bowl. The winners of the Atlantic conference's Loney Bowl will host the Yates Cup Ontario championship team for the Uteck Bowl.

Conference Playoffs

Atlantic University Sport 

On November 9, 2017, Atlantic University Sport announced that the Saint Mary's team had been disqualified due to an undisclosed eligibility violation, and that the Loney Bowl had been cancelled. The Acadia Axemen were declared conference champions by default. However, Saint Mary's took U Sports governing body to the Ontario Superior Court (where U Sports is headquartered) due to their interpretation of a player eligibility rule. Saint Mary's wide receiver Archelaus Jack had been on the practice roster of the Canadian Football League's Saskatchewan Roughriders until October 11, 2016. The league rules state that if a player is on a professional team's roster past August 15, that player would have to sit out one year. The rules were not clear on whether this referred to an academic year or season, or a 365-day period.

On November 12, one day after the game was originally scheduled, the Ontario judge ruled in favour of Saint Mary's and the Loney Bowl was re-scheduled for November 14, with the Uteck Bowl still scheduled for the following Saturday, November 18, against the Western Mustangs. Acadia won the game in overtime 45—38.

Réseau du sport étudiant du Québec

Ontario University Athletics

Canada West Universities Athletic Association

National Semifinals

National Championship

References

2017 in Canadian football
U Sports football seasons